Arab archery is the traditional style of archery practiced by the Arab peoples of the West Asia and North Africa from ancient to modern times.

Release style
The style of Arab archery described in the extant texts is similar to the styles used by Mongol and Turkish archers, drawing with a thumb draw and using a thumb ring to protect the right thumb. however some medieval muslim writers draw some differences between Arab archery and Turkish and Iranian archery stating that the bow of Hejazi Arabs is superior

Arab archery history
In 70 CE the town of Emesa (modern-day Homs, some 160 kilometers north of Damascus) sent archers to aid the Roman siege of Jerusalem. Hadrian knew Syria, having first visited in 117 and again in 123, shortly after his visit to Britannia. A Headstone of a Syrian archer was found along Hadrian's Wall, and dates from the 2nd century Common Era, when 200 Syrian archers were sent to reinforce the 8,000 Roman soldiers. The tombstone is now displayed at the Great North Museum: Hancock. Field archaeologist Mike Bishop, however, contends that everyone hunted, and the primary value of the Syrian archers was tactical—on the battlefield. Their bows, he explains, were Composite bows (also called “recurved”), capable of longer range than common longbows. “Correct and effective use of the composite bow,” Bishop adds, “took a lifetime to master, so Eastern recruits were essential.”

Arab archers used composite bows from foot, horse, and camel, to good effect from the 7th century.

Arabs used different kinds of arrows, arrow heads, and shafts. "Arab archers used spindle shaped arrows for incendiary purposes. These were formed from a series of hollow tubes, the ends of which were closed, the interiors 'as hollow as the spindles women use'. There was a cylindrical extension into which the head was fixed. The combustible material consisted of chopped straw and cotton soaked in molten tar and formed into pellets. These were stuffed into the tubes and set on fire before being shot. An alternative and vastly more sophisticated version involved otter-fat wax, black sulfur, Bdellium gum (similar to Myrrh), pith of fresh cherry seeds, coconut milk, sap of wild figs, and a piece of quick lime. This unlikely mixture was ground together, kneaded with oil of Balsam, rolled into small pellets and dried.  Before being shot, it was sprinkled with black sulfur. Seemingly it wasn't lit until being sent on its way. The entry ends, "being shot from a powerful bow, as it travels through the air it spontaneously bursts into flame." The writer is understandably skeptical of the claim, however, adding al-Tabai (a learned Arab judge) has declared this to be true, and has been practiced by an expert in Egypt."

Archery in Islam
Prophet Muhammad was quite good with a bow, and appreciated the benefits of archery in sports and warfare. A recurved bow made of bamboo, and ascribed to Muhammad, is held in the Sacred Relics (Topkapı Palace) in the Chamber of the Sacred Relics in the Topkapi Museum in Istanbul.

There are several comments by Muhammad concerning archery in the Hadith. Umm Salama told of Muhammed coming upon two groups practicing archery, and he praised them.

Malik ibn Anas spoke about when at the battle of Uhud, the troops left Muhammad behind, where the archer, Talhah, remained behind and protected the Prophet with his shield.

Uqbah ibn Amir relates how Muhammad said that archery shooting was more dear to him than riding.

The Prophet owned six bows: az-Zawra’, ar-Rauha’, as-Safra’, al-Bayda’, al-Katum – which was broken during the battle of Battle of Uhud, and was taken by Qatadah bin an-Nu’man – and as-Saddad. The Prophet had a quiver called al-Kafur, and a strap for it made from tanned skin, as well as three silver circular rings, a buckle, and an edge made of silver. According to a medieval Sunni scholar, "We should mention that Ibn Taymiyyah said that there are no authentic narrations that the Prophet ever wore a strap around his waist."

Camel archers
Camels stand higher than horses, and are more resilient in desert warfare. However, camels were often used as transport, and not as a platform for shooting. An account shows an Arab archer dismounting from his camel, and emptying his quiver on the ground before kneeling to shoot.

Camel archery is also attested by peoples not known to be Arab. The Old Testament shows how Joshua fought the Amalekites at Rephidim, who used camels for their archers. Gideon also fought against the Midianites and their camels during the time of the Judges.

Arab archery today
There are a number of Arab Archery clubs and societies today. Some practice the traditional Arab archery, while others use Western styles of archery in sport competition and hunting.
The main organization is FATA, or the "Fédération Arabe de Tir a L'Arc" of Lebanon, a member of the World Archery Federation. 
The Pan Arab Games usually have an archery competition, and the 12th Arab Games in Qatar held in 2011 had 60 archers from nine Arab countries compete.

List of Arabic works on archery
al-Sarakhsi al-Harawi, Kitab fada'il al-ramy fi sabil Allah, a collection of 38 hadiths on archery
Mardi ibn Ali al-Tarsusi, Tabsirat arbab al-albab fi kayfiyyat al-najat fi al-hurub, a general treatise on arms and armour that gives pride of place to the bow (c. 1174)
Ahmad ibn 'Abd Allah Muhibb al-Din al-Tabari, Kirab al-wadih fi ma'rifat 'ilm al-ramy (bef. 1295)
al-Yunini, Kitab fi ma'rifat 'ilm ramy al-siham (c. 1317–1324)
Taybugha al-Baklamishi, Ghunyat al-tullab fi ma'rifat al-ramy bi-l-nushshab (1368/9)
Ibn Qayyim al-Jawziyya, a treatise on Arab archery (14th century)
Anonymous, A Book on the Excellence of the Bow and Arrow, from Morocco (c. 1350–1400)

See also
 Chinese archery
 Kyūdō
 Turkish archery
 English longbow

References

Bibliography
 Boit, Bernard A. 1991. THE FRUITS OF ADVERSITY: TECHNICAL REFINEMENTS, OF THE TURKISH COMPOSITE BOW DURING THE CRUSADING ERA. (PDF) A Thesis Presented in Partial Fulfillment of the Requirements for the degree Master of Arts in the Graduate School of the Ohio State University by Lt. Bernard A. Boit, USAF.
 Faris, Nabih Amin, and Robert Potter Elmer. Arab Archery: An Arabic Manuscript of About A.D. 1500, "A Book on the Excellence of the Bow & Arrow" and the Description Thereof. Princeton, N.J.: Princeton University Press, 1986. 182 pages. Translation of "Kitāb fī bayān fadl al-qaws w-al-sahm wa-awsāfihima," no. 793 in Descriptive catalog of the Garrett collection of Arabic manuscripts in the Princeton University library.

 Latham, J. D., W. F. Paterson, and Ṭaybughā. Saracen Archery: An English Version and Exposition of a Mameluke Work on Archery (Ca. A.D. 1368). (PDF) London: Holland P., 1970. 
 McLeod, Wallace E. 1962. "Egyptian Composite Bows in New York." American Journal of Archaeology. Vol. 66, No. 1 (Jan., 1962), pp. 13–19
 Paterson, W. F. 1966. "The Archers of Islam." Journal of the Economic and Social History of the Orient. Vol. 9, No. 1/2 (Nov., 1966), pp. 69–87.
 Sukenik,Yigael. 1947. "The Composite Bow of the Canaanite Goddess Anath." Bulletin of the American Schools of Oriental Research. No. 107 (Oct., 1947), pp. 11–15.

External links
 The Art of Shooting a Short Reflexed Bow with a Thumb Ring. 2012. By Adam Swoboda. Gdynia Press.

Archery
Hunting methods
Ancient warfare
Warfare of the Middle Ages
Egyptian archers
History of archery